The list of shipwrecks in December 1941 includes all ships sunk, foundered, grounded, or otherwise lost during December 1941.

1 December

2 December

3 December

4 December

5 December

6 December

7 December

8 December

9 December

10 December

11 December

12 December

13 December

14 December

15 December

16 December

17 December

18 December

19 December

20 December

21 December

22 December

23 December
For the loss of the Italian coastal tanker Speranza on this day, see the entry for 30 November 1941.

24 December

25 December

26 December

27 December

28 December

29 December

30 December

31 December

Unknown date

Notes
 CKA are the Cyrillic letters. The English translation would be SKA.
 Luzon may have been sunk in early January 1942.

References

1941-12
 
Shipwrecks